Jija Lak Minle is a Punjabi music album. The album features Amar Singh Chamkila and Amarjot as the lead singers.

Amar Singh Chamkila albums